Pederalismo ng Dugong Dakilang Samahan (abbreviated as PDDS) is a national political party in the Philippines accredited by the Commission on Elections (COMELEC) on October 30, 2018. It was founded by Presidential Anti-Corruption (PACC) Chairman Greco Belgica. He says that the members are the original followers of Philippine president Rodrigo Duterte in the 2016 presidential election.  The main thrust of the party is for federalism to be applied to the Philippines. The party sought accreditation from the Commission on Elections so that it can run candidates for the 2019 midterm election.

2022 elections

2019 elections 
PDDS supported the candidacy of former Special Assistant to the President Bong Go, who won as Senator in the 2019 Senatorial Elections.

Eduardo Gadiano, their gubernatorial candidate in Occidental Mindoro is their highest ranking elected official.

The municipality of Omar, Sulu, has the most number of PDDS winning candidates consisting of its municipal mayor, vice mayor and the whole Municipal Council.

Electoral performance

President

Vice president

Senate

House of Representatives

References

External links 
 

Federalist parties
Federalism in the Philippines
Political parties established in 2018
Political parties in the Philippines
2018 establishments in the Philippines